Yeşilöz is a village in the District of Polatlı, Ankara Province, Turkey. The village is populated by Kurds.

References

Villages in Polatlı District

Kurdish settlements in Ankara Province